Sir Peter Jeffrey Mackie, 1st Baronet (26 November 1855 – 22 September 1924) was a Scottish whisky distiller and writer.

Mackie was born at St Ninians, Stirling. His father, Alexander Mackie (died 1884), was a distiller. His mother was Jane Simpson Brown (died 1886).

He was educated at Stirling High School and in 1878 joined his uncle's firm, James L. Mackie & Co, at the Lagavulin distillery on Islay. In the mid-1880s, he became a founding partner in Mackie & Co, which was established to market Lagavulin and other whiskies in London. In 1890, the two businesses amalgamated as Mackie & Co (Distillers) and began to blend White Horse. In 1895, Mackie's became a limited company and Peter Mackie became chairman, a post he held until his death. In 1924, the firm was renamed White Horse Distillers Ltd and became a public company.

Mackie travelled and wrote extensively on politics, especially on tariff reform and Imperial Federation. In 1918 he made a gift of pedigree cattle to Rhodesia to encourage ranching and cattle breeding. He also financed the Mackie Anthropological Expedition to Uganda. He was also a major landowner (owning  in Argyllshire), a Justice of the Peace for Argyllshire, Ayrshire and Lanarkshire, and an active member of the Scottish Unionist Association, serving as chairman from 1922.

He was created a baronet in the 1920 Birthday Honours.

Footnotes

References
Biography, Oxford Dictionary of National Biography
Obituary, The Times, 23 September 1924

1855 births
1924 deaths
People from Stirling
Scottish businesspeople
Scottish writers
Baronets in the Baronetage of the United Kingdom
People educated at Stirling High School